The 1977 South Australian National Football League season was the 98th season of the top-level Australian rules football competition in South Australia and marked 100 years since the inaugural 1877 SAFA season.

Ladder

Finals Series

Grand Final

Events
 On 2 July (Round 14), Woodville player John Roberts kicks a club record 16 goals against Central Districts, as the Peckers defeat the Bulldogs 24.16 (160) to 13.8 (86)

References

SANFL
South Australian National Football League seasons